Baby Alice is a Swedish Eurodance band, formed in 2005. The original band members are Tim Åström, Andreas Svensson, and Hanna Adolfsson. They are best known for their single, "Piña Colada Boy", and for their songs: "Mr. DJ", "Hurricane" and "Heaven Is A Dancefloor." The female vocals were provided by Hanna Adolfsson from 2005–2009; stage performance was provided by Sandra Gundstedt. Natalie Granath took over both vocals and stage performance from 2010–2015.

In 2016, original studio vocalist Hanna Adolfsson returned to Baby Alice, taking on the frontwoman position with their single "Naked", however, Hanna left the group in the fall of 2016 and new member My Hoglund was announced.

Discography

Official singles
Note: Most of these singles are available for purchase through digital stores, except "Shake It", which was an earlier single and, despite it being officially released, it is very rare.

 2006 – Shake It – Released as a single, rare
 2007 – Mr. DJ – First single release
 2009 – Hurricane – Second single release
 2010 – Piña Colada Boy – Third single release, originally recorded and due to release in 2008; The last to feature Hanna Adolfsson on vocals, the first to appear Natalie in the video
 2011 – Heaven Is A Dancefloor – Fourth single; The first to feature Natalie on vocals
 2015 – S.E.X.Y. – Originally planned as a single around 2011 and one of Baby Alice's first songs to feature their new vocalist Natalie, a radio edit of "S.E.X.Y." leaked online in 2011 and a remix of the song was previewed by its producer for the single and was also performed live by Baby Alice. In 2013, the song was uploaded to Baby Alice's YouTube as a gift to fans and was finally released as a digital single in 2015, without any of the planned remixes.
 2015 – Oldschool – Originally announced on Baby Alice's website for a March or April 2008 release as a single, the single was uploaded for free download on babyalice.se as a gift to the fans in 2009 and was finally released as a digital single in 2015.
 2015 – One World – Originally announced as a single in 2012, a preview was uploaded to Baby Alice's YouTube channel, though the single was delayed. It was finally released as a digital single in 2015, with a 90's Edit version being released as a separate single alongside it. This is also the last release to feature Natalie.
 2016 – Naked – Baby Alice's brand new summer song for 2016 and considered to be a follow-up to their hit single "Pina Colada Boy" from 2010, with a very similar style. It's also their first new song since Natalie's departure and Hanna becoming their new member in 2016. The full song was uploaded to their official YouTube channel and is now out as a single.
 2018 - VM Feber - Baby Alice released a new version of "VM-Feber" in support of the Swedish national team in 2018. Though not the first Baby Alice song to not feature female vocals, it's the first Baby Alice official release to be only sung by Tim and Andreas.
 2020 - Woff - Baby Alice will release their next single "Woff" in January.

Note: Despite popular belief, Hanna is the real singer on "Pina Colada Boy", Natalie appearing as the singer in the video, which was shot only a few weeks after she joined. Natalie's first appearance on vocals with Baby Alice is with the song "S.E.X.Y", which despite being planned as the next release after "Pina Colada Boy", was instead only leaked online until 2013 when it was uploaded to their official YouTube page. Baby Alice released "Heaven is a dancefloor" in 2011 with Natalie on the vocals.

Note: Vocals for "Pina Colada Boy" were recorded by Hanna Adolfsson in 2008, but the video for "Pina Colada Boy" was recorded 2 years later featuring Natalie as the main character.

Other Songs

The following songs were either released online as free downloads by Baby Alice at babyalice.se, compilation only songs or songs from their site player, some meant to be single for the planned album that didn't happen.

 2005 – The House Theme – Baby Alice's first song recorded in 2005 before Sandra was a member, free download online as a radio edit; Announced on Baby Alice's website in 2007, never made it to site player, never officially released. A SinSonic remix of this song was also available as a free download via SinSonic's website.
 2005 – Silicon Valley - A free download from their website, two versions exists with a very slightly different instrumental and different vocal recordings.
 2005 – Monstertruck - Exists as a radio edit, which was a free download on their website, and a "Censured Version", which played on Swedish radio. The first song of Baby Alice's to release a music video. Never officially released.
 2006 – Size Matters
 2006 – VM-Feber - Originally a free download as an mp3 from their official website, the song was remade and officially released as a single in 2018.
 2008 – Mambo – Exists as a Radio Edit with Hanna's vocals and a Euro Radio Edit with raps; Announced in 2007 and due for release in 2008, later cancelled, but both versions was available on the old site player and the Euro Radio Edit was available on the site player until 2016; Released to compilations in 2008. 
 2009 – Baby Alice (Medley) – A promotional megamix released to Baby Alice's site player in 2009; The songs in the medley are: Mr. DJ, Hurricane, Pina Colada Boy and Oldschool.

Unreleased Songs

During their time active since 2005, Baby Alice have recorded many songs that have been left unreleased, some of which were intended for their 2008 album that was never released. Below is a list of known songs recorded by Baby Alice that have not been officially released yet.

 1.2.3. Honesty – Announced to release in 2007, due for release in 2008, it was later cancelled but the song was available on the old Baby Alice site player.
 Take My Breath Away – Planned as a single in 2010 but was shelved when Sandra left Baby Alice. Existed online as a live clip until 2014, when Tim Åström uploaded the full demo on Baby Alice's fan group page after being requested by the fans.
 Rockin' Around The Christmas Tree – Announced in 2008 and was available on the site player, never released.
 No Angels Fly – Announced as a title of an upcoming song on Baby Alice's website in 2007; Former vocalist Sandra confirmed that the song was an idea of Baby Alice's, however, the lyrics were never written and it was never recorded.

References

External links
Official websites

 

Swedish Eurodance groups